Kindrum Lough is a freshwater lake in the northwest of Ireland. It is located in north County Donegal on the Fanad Peninsula.

Geography

Hydrology
Kindrum Lough is fed mainly by the Cashlan Stream entering at its southeastern end. The lake drains southwards into Mulroy Bay. Kindrum Lough is oligotrophic.

Natural history
Fish species in Kindrum Lough include brown trout, Arctic char, three-spined stickleback and the critically endangered European eel. Two rare plant species have been recorded from the lake: slender naiad (Najas flexilis) and a stonewort, Nitella spanioclema. The latter species is considered endemic to County Donegal. Kindrum Lough is part of the Kindrum Lough Special Area of Conservation.

See also
List of loughs in Ireland

References

Kindrum
Kindrum